The Senate Scholz II (Senat Scholz II) was the government of the German city-state of Hamburg from 15 April 2015 to 28 March 2018 following Senate Scholz I. The Cabinet was, for the second time, headed by First Mayor Olaf Scholz and was formed by the Social Democratic Party, who lost their overall majority in the last state-elections, along with Alliance 90/The Greens. On 15 April 2015 Scholz was elected and sworn in as Mayor by the state assembly. Afterwards he appointed the Senators and had them confirmed by the assembly.

Cabinet members hold the office of Senators and heads of their respective agency, except denoted otherwise.

Katharina Fegebank became acting head of the government on 13 March 2018, after Olaf Scholz retired. Scholz was succeeded by Peter Tschentscher on 28 March 2018, who formed the new state government.

The Senate 

|}

References

External links
 The senate of Hamburg

Cabinets of Hamburg
Cabinets established in 2015
Cabinets disestablished in 2018
2015 establishments in Germany
2018 disestablishments in Germany
Olaf Scholz